The 1976 World Club Challenge was an unofficial trial of what would later become the World Club Challenge concept, with the 1975 NSWRFL season's premiers, Eastern Suburbs hosting the 1975–76 Northern Rugby Football League season's Premiership and Challenge Cup winners St. Helens. The one-off challenge match was played on 29 June, right in the middle of the 1976 NSWRFL season, at the Sydney Cricket Ground before a crowd of 26,856.

The next game of its kind would not be played until 1987.

Background
The game was the first of its type, and was the last to be played in Australia until 1994.

Eastern Suburbs Roosters
The Roosters, coached by Jack Gibson and captained by Australian international forward Arthur Beetson, were the reigning Sydney premiers having won the NSWRFL Grand Finals in both 1974 and 1975.

St Helens
Saints were the reigning English champions, having won the title in 1974-75. Saints were coached by former Great Britain captain Eric Ashton and captained by Welsh dual rugby international Kel Coslett.

Teams

Match details

Aftermath
After winning the 1974 and 1975 Sydney premierships, Eastern Suburbs would not win another until 2002, while St Helens would go on to win a third English premiership in succession in 1976–77.

The next time Easts, now known as the Sydney Roosters, would play in a World Club Challenge was in 2003 where they would again face St Helens, the 2002 Super League champions at the Reebok Stadium in Bolton, England. The result would be no different though as the Roosters defeated the Saints 38-0 in front of 19,807 fans.

To celebrate the 40th anniversary of the challenge, St Helens and the Sydney Roosters played a match as part of the 2016 World Club Series.

See also
World Club Challenge

References

External links
1976 World Club Challenge at superleague.co.uk
1976 World Club Challenge at rugbyleagueproject.com

World Club Challenge
Sydney Roosters matches
St Helens R.F.C. matches
International rugby league competitions hosted by Australia
Rugby league in Sydney
World Club Challenge
1976 rugby league matches